The Western Military Region (MR N) is a Swedish military region within the Swedish Armed Forces. Established in 2013, the military region staff in based in Skövde. The military region includes Halland County, Värmland County, Västra Götaland County and Örebro County.

History
The Western Military Region was formed on 1 January 2013 as Military Region West, as one of four military regions in Sweden. The military region includes Halland County, Värmland County, Västra Götaland County and Örebro County. The region's staff is located in Skövde with the task of leading surveillance and protection tasks, implementing civil-military cooperation and support to society. The Western Military Region's Home Guard battalions are 10 in number. On 1 October 2018, a separate command position was appointed for Military Region West. From 2019, the name Western Military Region was adopted. From 1 January 2020, all military regions are independent units subordinate to the Chief of Home Guard. In doing so, the regions also take over the command in peacetime from the training groups with their Home Guard battalions. Each military region has production management responsibility. This meant that five training groups were transferred from Skaraborg Regiment to the Western Military Region.In a government's bill, however, the Swedish government emphasized that the military regional division could be adjusted, depending on the outcome of the investigation Ansvar, ledning och samordning inom civilt försvar ("Responsibility, leadership and coordination in civil defense").

Units

Current units
Hallandsgruppen (HLG)
45th Home Guard Battalion/Halland Battalion
Elfsborgsgruppen (EBG)
41st Home Guard Battalion/Southern Gothenburg Battalion
42n Home Guard Battalion/Northern Gothenburg Battalion
43rd Home Guard Battalion/Gothenburg Archipelago Battalion
44th Home Guard Battalion/Älvsborg Battalion
Bohusdalsgruppen (BDG)
40th Home Guard Battalion/Bohus Battalion
Skaraborgsgruppen (SBG)
38th Home Guard Battalion/Kinne Battalion
39th Home Guard Battalion/Kåkind Battalion
Örebro- och Värmlandsgruppen (ÖVG)
19th Home Guard Battalion/Värmland Battalion
20th Home Guard Battalion/Sannahed Battalion

Heraldry and traditions

Coat of arms
The coat of arms of the Western Military Region was previously used by the Southern Military District (Milo S) from 1994 to 2000 and the Southern Military District (MD S) from 2000 to 2005. Blazon: "Azure, with waves argent six times divided bendy-sinister argent, charged with a doubletailed crowned lion rampant or, armed and langued gules. The shield surmounted an erect sword or."

Commanding officers
From 2013 to 2017, the military region commander was also commander of the Norrbotten Regiment. From 2018 to 2020, military region commander was subordinate to the Chief of Joint Operations in territorial activities as well as in operations. Furthermore, the military region commander has territorial responsibility over his own military region and leads territorial activities as well as regional intelligence and security services. From 1 January 2020, all military region commanders are subordinate to the Chief of Home Guard.

2013–2017: Colonel Fredrik Ståhlberg
2017–2017: Colonel Bengt Alexandersson
2018–20xx: Colonel Peter Hederstedt

Names, designations and locations

See also
Western Military District (Milo V)

Footnotes

References

Notes

Print

External links
 

Military regions of Sweden
Military units and formations established in 2013
2013 establishments in Sweden
Skövde Garrison